Didone abbandonata is a libretto by Metastasio

It was set multiple times including:
 Didone abbandonata (Sarro) 1724 - original
 Didone abbandonata (Albinoni) 1724
 Didone abbandonata (Vinci) 1726
 Didone abbandonata (Hasse) 1742
 Didone abbandonata (Sarti) 1762
 Didone abbandonata (Jommelli) 1763
 Didone abbandonata (Galuppi) 1766
 Didone abbandonata (Mercadante) 1824
Other works on the theme include
"Didone abbandonata", cantata by Giovanni Alberto Ristori (1692-1753)
Didone abbandonata (Clementi) piano sonata
Didone abbandonata (Tartini) violin sonata in G minor, B.g10

See also
 Didone (disambiguation)